Ancylolomia pectinatellus is a species of moth in the family Crambidae. It is found in Italy, Hungary, Croatia, Bulgaria, the Republic of Macedonia, Greece, Asia Minor, Syria, the Palestinian territories, Iraq and Iran.

The wingspan is about 25 mm.

References

Moths described in 1847
Ancylolomia
Moths of Europe
Moths of Asia